Battle of Mysunde may refer to:
Battle of Mysunde (1848), a skirmish during the First Schleswig War
Battle of Mysunde (1864), the first battle of the Second Schleswig War